Amar Alikadić (born 15 June 1998) is a Bosnian professional footballer who plays as a defender.

Club career

Velež Mostar
Alikadić is a product of the Velež Mostar youth academy. He made his professional debut for Velež on 27 February 2016, against Vitez in a Bosnian Premier League match. On 25 May 2019, Alikadić won the First League of FBiH with Velež after the club beat Bosna Visoko 0–2 away and got promoted to the Bosnian Premier League after getting relegated three years earlier.

In January 2020, Alikadić was sent on a six month-long loan to First League of FBiH club Igman Konjic. In June 2020, he was sent on a loan to another First League of FBiH club, Čapljina.

Honours
Velež Mostar
First League of FBiH: 2018–19

References

External links
Amar Alikadić at Sofascore

1998 births
Living people
Sportspeople from Mostar
Bosnia and Herzegovina footballers
Premier League of Bosnia and Herzegovina players
First League of the Federation of Bosnia and Herzegovina
FK Velež Mostar players
FK Igman Konjic players
HNK Čapljina players
Association football defenders